The displacement or displacement tonnage of a ship is its weight. As the term indicates, it is measured indirectly, using Archimedes' principle, by first calculating the volume of water  displaced by the ship, then converting that value into weight. Traditionally, various measurement rules have been in use, giving various measures in long tons. Today, tonnes are more commonly used.

Ship displacement varies by a vessel's degree of load, from its empty weight as designed (known as "lightweight tonnage")  to its maximum load. Numerous specific terms are used to describe varying levels of load and trim, detailed below.

Ship displacement should not be confused with measurements of volume or capacity typically used for commercial vessels and measured by tonnage: net tonnage and gross tonnage.

Calculation

The process of determining a vessel's displacement begins with measuring its draft. This is accomplished by means of its "draft marks" (or "load lines").  A merchant vessel has three matching sets:  one mark each on the port and starboard sides forward, midships, and astern. These marks allow a ship's displacement to be determined to an accuracy of 0.5%.

The draft observed at each set of marks is averaged to find a mean draft. The ship's hydrostatic tables show the corresponding volume displaced.
To calculate the weight of the displaced water, it is necessary to know its density. Seawater (1,025 kg/m3) is more dense than fresh water (1,000 kg/m3); so a ship will ride higher in salt water than in fresh. The density of water also varies with temperature.

Devices akin to slide rules have been available since the 1950s to aid in these calculations. Presently, it is done with computers.

Displacement is usually measured in units of tonnes or long tons.

Definitions

There are terms for the displacement of a vessel under specified conditions:

Loaded displacement
Loaded displacement is the weight of the ship including cargo, passengers, fuel, water, stores, dunnage and such other items necessary for use on a voyage.  These bring the ship down to its "load draft", colloquially known as the "waterline".
Full load displacement and loaded displacement have almost identical definitions.  Full load  is defined as the displacement of a vessel when floating at its greatest allowable draft as approved by the load line assigning authority which is either the flag state (USCG etc) or a classification society (and designated by its "waterline"). Warships have full load condition established through the Naval design process, and are exempt from commercial requirements laid out by flag state laws.

Light displacement
Light displacement (LDT) is defined as the weight of the ship excluding cargo, fuel, water, ballast, stores, passengers, crew, but with water in boilers to steaming level.

Normal displacement
Normal displacement is the ship's displacement "with all outfit, and two-thirds supply of stores, ammunition, etc., on board."

Standard displacement
Standard displacement, also known as "Washington displacement", is a specific term defined by the Washington Naval Treaty of 1922.  "It is the displacement of the ship complete, fully manned, engined, and equipped ready for sea, including all armament and ammunition, equipment, outfit, provisions and fresh water for crew, miscellaneous stores, and implements of every description that are intended to be carried in war, but without fuel or reserve boiler feed water on board."

Gallery

See also

 Naval architecture
 Hull (watercraft)
 Hydrodynamics
 Tonnage

References

Bibliography
 

 .
 

Water transport
Shipbuilding
Nautical terminology
Ship measurements